Constructed in 1954, the Qinghai-Xinjiang Highway, also known as the China National Highway 315 (G315) runs west from Xining, Qinghai towards Kashgar, Xinjiang. In 1994 the departments of communication and transportation in Qinghai and Xinjiang began the process of updating the highway. In the west it follows the desert Qaidam Basin south of the traditional Silk Road, crosses the Altyn-Tagh into Xinjiang,  and then follows the south side of the Tarim Basin to Kashgar.

Route and distance

Gallery

Hotan Prefecture (Mingfeng-Hotan-Pishan), Xinjiang

Kashgar Prefecture (Yarkand-Yengisar-Kashgar), Xinjiang

See also 
 China National Highways

References

External links 

Transport in Xinjiang
Transport in Qinghai
315